Jonas Vinck (born 25 June 1995) is a Belgian professional footballer who plays as a right-back for Virton.

External links

1995 births
Living people
Belgian footballers
Association football defenders
Lierse S.K. players
K.M.S.K. Deinze players
Challenger Pro League players
Lierse Kempenzonen players
R.E. Virton players
People from Asse
Belgian Third Division players
Footballers from Flemish Brabant